The Pocono Record is a daily newspaper published in print and online in Stroudsburg, Pennsylvania, United States.

History
The Pocono Record was founded as the Stroudsburg Daily Times on April 2, 1894.

In 1946, the newspaper was purchased by James H. Ottaway, Sr., becoming the third newspaper in what would become the Ottaway Community Newspapers chain, which was purchased by Dow Jones and Company in the 1980s. Dow Jones was eventually purchased by News Corp. Today, the Pocono Record is a subsidiary of Local Media Group.

On September 4, 2013, News Corp announced that it would sell the Dow Jones Local Media Group to Newcastle Investment Corp.—an affiliate of Fortress Investment Group, for $87 million. The newspapers will be operated by GateHouse Media, a newspaper group owned by Fortress. News Corp. CEO and former Wall Street Journal editor Robert James Thomson indicated that the newspapers were "not strategically consistent with the emerging portfolio" of the company.  GateHouse in turn filed prepackaged Chapter 11 bankruptcy on September 27, 2013, to restructure its debt obligations in order to accommodate the acquisition.

Officially, the article "The" is not part of the newspaper's name.

Market
The Pocono Record is the newspaper of record for Monroe County, Pennsylvania. Its coverage area centers on Stroudsburg and East Stroudsburg and includes the area's many small communities. The newspaper also covers parts of Pike, Lackawanna, Wayne and Carbon counties as well as areas of western New Jersey.

Monroe County is one of Pennsylvania's fastest-growing counties, giving the Pocono Record tremendous growth opportunities. However, this is a challenge for the newspaper because much of the population commutes to New York City or New Jersey and feels little connection to Monroe County - and therefore lacks the motivation to read the community newspaper.

Because of this, the Pocono Record lacks any direct local competitors but competes against newspapers such as the New York Post and New York Daily News. In addition, the Pocono Record competes with regional publications such as the Wilkes-Barre Times-Leader, Scranton Times-Tribune and the Allentown Morning Call.

Online publications
The Pocono Record first went online in the early 1990s. Online publications include:

PoconoRecord.com
The main newspaper Web site is at PoconoRecord.com and is updated daily with the printed news as well as throughout the day with breaking news and updates. The primary site also offers a news archive powered by Google. The Living Here community pages not only organize news by region but also include database information about each community.

The site has several news-related special report sites.

Daily Newspaper
The Pocono Record publishes seven days a week. The newspaper is available via home delivery or at newsstands and retail locations throughout the area.

Newsroom
The Pocono Record'''s newsroom is located in Stroudsburg, along with the newspaper's administrative and sales offices.

Sister publications
In addition to its flagship daily newspaper, the Pocono Record publishes several other publications:

Eastern Poconos Community News
The Eastern Poconos Community News, or Community News for short, is mailed free of charge to residents of eastern Monroe County. The weekly paper features some original material and columns, but relies heavily on reprinting stories from the daily Pocono Record. About 9,700 copies are mailed to residents of Smithfield, Middle Smithfield,
Price and Lehman townships.

Sage
Formerly known as Dignity, Sage is a monthly publication aimed at active senior citizens. It is inserted into the Pocono Record and available free throughout the area.

Pocono Record PLUS
Pocono Record PLUS is the Pocono Record's total market coverage product. It is mailed free to all non-subscribers every Saturday.

Poconos Property Showcase
This monthly booklet, which features local real estate listings, is inserted into the Pocono Record'' and available free of charge throughout the area.

References

External links

 

Gannett publications
Daily newspapers published in Pennsylvania
Pocono Mountains
Companies based in Monroe County, Pennsylvania